FM 91.1 CMS (callsign 1CMS) is a multilingual community radio station broadcasting to Canberra, in languages other than English, from studios in the suburb of Holder. CMS is a member of the National Ethnic and Multicultural Broadcasters Council (NEMBC) and the Community Broadcasting Association of Australia (CBAA).

The policy of CMS is to encourage all languages to broadcast for at least an hour each week, providing time on an equitable basis. Programming priorities include youth, women and emerging communities.

History
The EBC (Ethnic Broadcasters Council) as it was then called, started broadcasting by purchasing airtime on community station 2XX. Up to 25 language groups were broadcasting for half an hour each per week during the 1980s. Discontent in the early 1990s saw the EBC and 2XX sever ties with each other. EBC were off the air until August 1992 when they were able to apply for their own test broadcast licence. EBC were back on air on Tuesdays and Fridays using the facilities of ArtSound FM.

In 1999 the EBC received a full-time test licence to broadcast on 103.5 FM. Soon after the on air identity was changed to Canberra Multicultural Service and the frequency moved to the present 91.1 FM. Then an application for a full broadcasting licence was applied for. This was granted on 15 June 2001.

Current

FM 91.1 CMS now has programming in around 30 languages. The station broadcasts live from the Canberra Multicultural Festival each year. Internet streaming was introduced in 2008.

Programming

As of 2008, the station broadcasts in the following languages:

 Bosnian
 Cantonese
 Chilean Spanish
 Croatian
 Cypriot Greek
 Dutch
 Persian
 Belgian Dutch (Flemish)
 French
 German
 Greek
 Hindi
 Indonesian
 Italian
 Lao
 Macedonian
 Mandarin
 Motu/Pigin
 Polish
 Samoan
 Serbian
 Sinhalese
 Slovenian
 Spanish
 Swiss German
 Tamil
 Telugu
 Thai
 Tongan
 Urdu
 Vietnamese

Satellite programming from Deutsche Welle, Radio France International and the National Indigenous Radio Service is also carried.

See also
 List of radio stations in Australia

References

External links

Radio stations in Canberra
Community radio stations in Australia
Radio stations established in 2000
Ethnic radio stations in Australia